The 1950 Colgate Red Raiders football team was an American football team that represented Colgate University as an independent during the 1950 college football season. In its fourth season under head coach Paul Bixler, the team compiled a 5–3 record and was outscored by a total of 193 to 184. Alan Egler was the team captain. The team played its home games at Colgate Athletic Field in Hamilton, New York.

Schedule

References

Colgate
Colgate Raiders football seasons
Colgate Red Raiders football